Otto Hænning (19 November 1916 – 7 February 2004) was a Danish composer and guitarist.

See also
List of Danish composers

References
This article was initially translated from the Danish Wikipedia.

Danish composers
Male composers
Danish guitarists
1916 births
2004 deaths
20th-century guitarists
20th-century Danish male musicians